Lizard Point is a low morainic point along the west side of upper Beardmore Glacier, Antarctica, marking the south side of the entrance to glacier-filled Table Bay. It was named by the British Antarctic Expedition, 1910–13.

References

Headlands of the Ross Dependency
Shackleton Coast